Robert Turnbull Rice (May 28, 1899 – February 20, 1986) was a third baseman in Major League Baseball. He played for one month with the Philadelphia Phillies in September, 1926.

References

External links

1899 births
1986 deaths
Major League Baseball third basemen
Philadelphia Phillies players
Waynesboro Red Birds players
Minor league baseball managers
Baseball players from Philadelphia